is one of the five wards of Kumamoto City, Japan. Meaning literally "west ward," it is bordered by the Kita-ku, Chūō-ku, Minami-ku and also by the city of Tamana and the town of Gyokutō. As of 2012, it has a population of 93,394 people and an area of 88.21 km2. 
Nishi-ku will host group games at the 2019 World Women's Handball Championship.

External links

Wards of Kumamoto